The following are video games dedicated to the management or simulation of theme parks.

Construction simulators
Many titles are construction and management simulation games. Players must construct roller coasters and sometimes other fairground attractions in order to attract visitors to their fairgrounds or otherwise achieve their goals.

Roller coaster games in other genres
Some video games concerned with roller coasters belong to other video game genres, these are listed below.

See also
List of city-building video games
List of business simulation video games
List of simulation video games

References

Rollercoaster